Kooroomool is a rural locality in the Cassowary Coast Region, Queensland, Australia.

Geography 
Most of Kooroomool is within the Tully Gorge National Park, except for a small portion in the north-west of the locality which is within the Koombooloomba National Park.

Kooroomool has the following mountains:

 Mount Kooroomool 
 Mount Theodore

History 

References 

Cassowary Coast Region
Localities in Queensland